ABC Mildura Swan Hill (call sign: 3MIL) is an ABC Local Radio station based in Mildura, Victoria. The station, opened in 1990, covers northwest Victoria and southwest New South Wales, including Mildura, Swan Hill, Kerang, and Ouyen.

References

Mildura-Swan Hill
Mildura
Radio stations established in 1990
Radio stations in Victoria
1990 establishments in Australia